Asa Pollard (November 15, 1735 – June 15, 1775) was an American soldier. He was the first soldier to be killed at the Battle of Bunker Hill in the American Revolutionary War.

Early life 
Asa Pollard born on November 15, 1735, in North Billerica, Province of Massachusetts to John and Mary Pollard, two farmers.

American Revolutionary War 
Pollard enlisted in the Continental Army on May 8, 1775, and his first battle was during the  Battles of Lexington and Concord.  He died in the Battle of Bunker Hill (fought on Breed's Hill) when a cannonball, shot from a ship, decapitated him.

Notes

References 
 
 

1735 births
1775 deaths
United States military personnel killed in the American Revolutionary War
Massachusetts militiamen in the American Revolution
People from Billerica, Massachusetts